Angus Campbell may refer to:

Angus Campbell (psychologist) (1910 – 1980), American social psychologist
Angus Campbell (ice hockey) (1884 – 1976), founder of the Northern Ontario Hockey Association (NOHA)
Angus Campbell MacInnes (1885 – 1977), Anglican bishop
Frank Hoy (died 2005), who wrestled under various names including Angus Campbell
Angus Peter Campbell, Scottish novelist and poet
Angus Campbell (general), Australian general
Angus Campbell, member of UK garage group B-15 Project
Angus Campbell, Senior Partner and Deputy Head of Studio at Foster and Partners